Robert Russell Newton (July 7, 1918 – June 2, 1991) was an American physicist, astronomer, and historian of science.

Newton was Supervisor of the Applied Physics Laboratory at Johns Hopkins University.

Newton was known for his book The Crime of Claudius Ptolemy (1977). In Newton's view, Ptolemy was "the most successful fraud in the history of science". Newton claimed that Ptolemy had predominantly obtained the astronomical results described in his work The Almagest by computation, and not by the direct observations that Ptolemy described. Distrust of Ptolemy's observations goes back at least as far as doubts raised in the 16th century by Tycho Brahe and in the 18th century by Delambre. R. R. Newton also made a charge of conscious falsification.

Newton was also known for his work on change of the rotation rate of the earth, and historical observations of eclipses; however, his results “are simply meaningless.” His steps were rarely detailed, his reasoning rarely explained.

Bibliography

References

External links 

Hugh Thurston's 1998 condensation of R. Newton's 1977 Crime of Claudius Ptolemy. DIO 8.1 pp.3-17. PDF.

1918 births
1991 deaths
Johns Hopkins University faculty
20th-century American physicists
American astronomers